Torodora arcifera is a moth in the family Lecithoceridae. It was described by Edward Meyrick in 1907. It is found in Bhutan.

The wingspan is 14–15 mm. The forewings are dark purplish-bronzy fuscous. The stigmata are blackish, the plical and first discal confluent, edged posteriorly by a slightly curved ochreous-whitish line from two-fifths of the costa to the middle of the dorsum, the second discal is obscurely edged with whitish and with an additional similar dot beneath it. There is an ochreous-whitish dot on the costa at four-fifths. The hindwings are fuscous.

References

Moths described in 1907
Torodora